The Pomme de Terre River (pronounced pohm de TEHR) is a  tributary of the Osage River in southwestern Missouri in the United States.  Via the Osage and Missouri rivers, it is part of the watershed of the Mississippi River.

Pomme de terre is French for potato, a food Indians harvested in the area.  Before the French explorers, the Osage people, who were historically indigenous to the region, had called it a name meaning Big Bone River, referring to the fossils of mastodons and other ancient creatures which they found along its eroding banks.

Course
The Pomme de Terre River is formed in Greene County in the Ozarks by the confluence of its short north and south forks, which rise in Webster and Greene counties, respectively.  The river flows generally northward through Dallas, Polk, Hickory and Benton counties, past the town of Hermitage.  In Polk County it collects the short Little Pomme de Terre River, which rises in Greene County and flows generally northwestwardly.  In Hickory County a U.S. Army Corps of Engineers dam causes the river to form Pomme de Terre Lake.  It enters the Osage River as an arm of Truman Lake, which is formed by a dam on the Osage.

See also
List of Missouri rivers

References

Rivers of Missouri
Rivers of Benton County, Missouri
Rivers of Dallas County, Missouri
Rivers of Greene County, Missouri
Rivers of Hickory County, Missouri
Rivers of Polk County, Missouri
Rivers of Webster County, Missouri
Bodies of water of the Ozarks
Tributaries of the Missouri River